Máel Coluim II (or Maol Choluim II, usually anglicized as Malcolm II), was a 13th-century Mormaer of Fife who ruled the mormaerdom or earldom of Fife between 1228 and 1266. He was the nephew of Máel Coluim I, the previous mormaer, and the son of Máel Coluim I's brother Donnchadh, son of Donnchadh II.

He is one of the Scottish magnates whose name occurred as a guarantor in the Treaty of York on 25 September 1237. He participated in the famous inauguration of King Alexander III of Scotland at Scone on 13 July 1249, where the mormaers of Fife had a traditional senior role in the coronation. He played a role during the minority of Alexander III of Scotland, being appointed one of the guardians of the king on 20 September 1255.

He appears to have had a close relationship with Henry III of England, both during the minority and after, and in Scotland may have been allied with Alan Durward. He was fined in Northumberland on 24 April 1256, for not appearing before royal justices on the first day of their session, as presumably ordered. He disappears from the records after the coup against the minority administration in 1256–57, but reappears a few years later when he is recorded swearing an oath to Henry to promise to maintain the position of the young king and queen when the latter, Henry III's daughter Margaret, went to England in 1260.

Máel Coluim II died in 1266. He had married Elen ferch Llywelyn, who after Máel Coluim's death married the Mormaer of Mar, Domhnall. He had two sons who are known to us. The elder was Colbán, to whom the mormaerdom passed after Máel Coluim's death. Chieftaincy of Clann Meic Duibh went to another son, whose name, however, is unknown as he was only referred to by his title MacDuibh. Máel Coluim appears from later records to have granted lands to this younger son, which were later dispossessed by William Wishart, Bishop of St Andrews, later backed by King John de Balliol, against whom MacDuibh appealed to King Edward I of England. MacDuibh died leading the men of Fife in the Battle of Falkirk alongside William Wallace.

Notes

Bibliography
 Bannerman, John, "MacDuff of Fife", in A. Grant & K.Stringer (eds.) Medieval Scotland: Crown, Lordship and Community, Essays Presented to G.W.S. Barrow (Edinburgh, 1993), pp. 20–38
 McDonald, Andrew, "Macduff family, earls of Fife (per. c. 1095–1371)", in the Oxford Dictionary of National Biography, Oxford University Press, 2004, accessed 8 Aug 2007
 Paul, James Balfour, The Scots Peerage, Vol. IV (Edinburgh, 1907)

1266 deaths
Clan MacDuff
People from Fife
Year of birth unknown
Mormaers of Fife
13th-century mormaers